Samuel Angier (1639–1713) was an English nonconformist minister, one of the first after 1660  to receive presbyterian ordination.

Life
The nephew of John Angier, he was born at Dedham 28 August 1639, and was a pupil of Richard Busby. He went to Christ Church, Oxford, in 1659, but was compelled to leave by the Act of Uniformity 1662.

After some time staying with John Owen he settled as assistant to his uncle at Denton. His ordination, which took place in 1672 at the house of Robert Eaton in Deansgate, Manchester, was the first presbyterian ordination amongst the nonconformists in the north of England, and perhaps the first in any part of the kingdom.

At his uncle's death many people supported Samuel Angier as his successor. The warden and fellows of Manchester, however, were not disposed to appoint another nonconformist, and the Rev. John Ogden was nominated; but great difficulty was experienced in inducing Samuel Angier to give up possession of the house. He retired to the adjacent village of Dukinfield.

He had to suffer for his nonconformity, and in 1680 was excommunicated; but under the Act of Toleration in 1689 he became minister of a dissenting meeting at Dukinfield, where a chapel was built for him in 1708. In his later years he was almost blind, and died 8 November 1713. Angier kept a register of 'christenings and some marriages and funerals' from 1677 to 1713. One entry relates to the death, 20 February 1698, of another Samuel Angier, who is believed to have been a minister of the 'ancient chapel' of Toxteth Park, Liverpool.

References

Attribution

1639 births
1713 deaths
English Presbyterian ministers
Alumni of Christ Church, Oxford
People from Dedham, Essex